Shelin (also Romanized as Shelīn; also known as Shelī and Shelīn Dīreh) is a village in Direh Rural District, in the Central District of Gilan-e Gharb County, Kermanshah Province, Iran. At the 2006 census, its population was 233, in 58 families.

References 

Populated places in Gilan-e Gharb County